Ivan Dmitrievich Fedotov (Russian: Иван Дмитревич Федотов; born 28 November 1996) is a Finnish-born Russian professional ice hockey goaltender. He is currently under contract with the Philadelphia Flyers of the National Hockey League (NHL).

On 1 July 2022, after signing his NHL contract, Fedotov was arrested for alleged evasion of military service, which prevented him from joining the Philadelphia Flyers.

Playing career
On 12 December 2014, Fedotov made his Kontinental Hockey League debut playing with HC Neftekhimik Nizhnekamsk during the 2014–15 KHL season. Fedotov was drafted by the Philadelphia Flyers in the 7th round of the 2015 NHL Draft with the 188th overall selection.

Unable to add to his solitary game with Nizhnekamsk, Fedotov was traded to Salavat Yulaev Ufa on May 4, 2016.

Following the 2018–19 season, having played the majority of the year in Salavat's VHL farm club, Fedotov was traded to Traktor Chelyabinsk on 6 May 2019.

On 2 May 2021, Fedotov left Traktor after two seasons when he was traded to CSKA Moscow in exchange for financial compensation. In the 2021–22 season, while playing with the perennially contending CSKA, Fedotov assumed the starting goaltender role and appeared in 26 games with a 14–10–2 record and a 2.00 GAA and .919 save percentage. He collected 16 wins through 22 games in the post-season in helping CSKA claim their second Gagarin Cup in franchise history. He was named as a finalist for the KHL's top goaltender of the year.

On 7 May 2022, Fedotov as a free agent was signed a one-year, entry-level contract with the Philadelphia Flyers.

On 1 July 2022, Fedotov was arrested for alleged evasion of military service and sent to Severomorsk, which prevented him from joining the Philadelphia Flyers.

International play

On 23 January 2022, Fedotov was named to the roster to represent Russian Olympic Committee athletes at the 2022 Winter Olympics.

Awards and honors

Personal life 
On 1 July 2022 Fedotov was arrested in Saint Petersburg for alleged evasion of military service. He reportedly arrived at the town of Severomorsk, which is home to the administrative base of the Northern Fleet of the Russian Navy.

References

External links

1996 births
Living people
Chelmet Chelyabinsk players
HC CSKA Moscow players
HC Neftekhimik Nizhnekamsk players
Philadelphia Flyers draft picks
Russian ice hockey goaltenders
Ice hockey people from Saint Petersburg
Salavat Yulaev Ufa players
Toros Neftekamsk players
Traktor Chelyabinsk players
Ice hockey players at the 2022 Winter Olympics
Medalists at the 2022 Winter Olympics
Olympic silver medalists for the Russian Olympic Committee athletes
Olympic medalists in ice hockey
Olympic ice hockey players of Russia